Shin Jung Hyun & Yup Juns was a South Korean rock band formed by Shin Jung-hyeon (lead guitarist, lead vocal), Lee Nam-yi (bassist), and Kim Ho-sik (drummer). "Yup Jun" is an ad hoc romanisation of yeopjeon ("leaf coin"), a kind of old brass coin with a square hole.

The band's album Shin Jung Hyun & Yup Juns Vol. 1, released in 1974, sold more than one million copies. Its most popular song "The Beauty" (Mi-in), was nicknamed "the song of thirty million" (referring to South Korea's total population at the time). It was used as background music in the Lee Man-hee film A Girl Who Looks Like the Sun released that year, one of Lee's last before his death in 1975.

The band's next album, Shin Jung Hyun & Yup Juns Vol. 2, was an implicit rebuke to the dictator Park Chung-hee: according to Shin's son Shin Daechul, Park had demanded that Shin make a song praising Park, but instead Shin and his fellow band members wrote the lyrics of the album's song "Beautiful Rivers and Mountains" (Areumdaun Gangsan) about the beautiful natural landscapes of Korea. This led to increasing troubles for the band. In particular, "The Beauty" was banned on 9 July 1975, one of 45 songs banned that day by the Park dictatorship under the censorship provisions of the Yusin Constitution, and remained illegal until it was unbanned on 18 August 1987 just after the National Liberation Day celebrations. "The Beauty" was believed to have become a target for censorship not just due to the political troubles of the band itself and because of the dictatorship's general suspicion of youth culture, but because one line of the lyrics was a popular target for parodies among fans, by replacing "see" (보고, bogo) with other words:

Specifically, one parody replaced bogo with the light verb hago (하고), which could be interpreted as merely obscene ("I want to do [her] once", etc.), or could be given a political slant by interpreting it as "I want to be [president] once, be [president] twice, keep on being [president]", a reference to the 1972 removal of presidential term limits in the earlier constitution which allowed Park to continue into his second decade as president.

On 5 December 1975, the Seoul District Prosecutor's Office applied for an arrest warrant for band leader Shin Jung-hyeon on charges of violating of the Addictive Drugs Control Act (습관성의약품관리법), specifically of having allegedly used marijuana beginning in October 1972, and of having supplied  of marijuana to another singer. His trial began on 24 December, and he was forcibly committed to a mental institution for treatment. In January 1976, the Ministry of Culture and Public Information (문화공보부) announced an indefinite ban on public performances and album releases by 54 entertainers who had been linked to marijuana, Shin among them. As a result, the band broke up.

Discography
Shin Jung Hyun & Yup-Juns Vol. 1 (Sin Junghyeon-gwa Yeopjeondeul Je Il Jip; 1974)
Instrumental Best (Yeonjugok Beseuteu; 1975)
Shin Jung Hyun & Yup-Juns Vol. 2 (Sin Junghyeon-gwa Yeopjeondeul Je I Jip; 1975)

References

South Korean rock music groups
Musical groups established in 1972
Musical groups disestablished in 1975